Francis Collings is a journalist working as a TV News Foreign correspondent. 
Formerly with the BBC in London, is now with TRT World in Istanbul.

At the BBC he presented on the BBC News channel, and on BBC World News. He also presented on BBC One news bulletins as well as BBC Breakfast.

He has covered events both sporting and political, including football World cups, Olympics, Paralympics, and Wimbledon Tennis. He has also reported on court cases at Royal Courts of Justice in London.

Prior to the BBC he worked for Talk Radio UK, Independent Radio News, Radio TV Hong Kong, LBC, the BBC World Service and BBC Radios 1, 2, 4 and 5.  He has also written articles for the national press in the United Kingdom including the Scotsman, the Guardian and the London Evening Standard.

He's lived and worked in ten countries including Belize, Germany, Cyprus, Spain, Syria and Turkey.
And was based in Damascus, studying Arabic and Middle East politics, when the Syrian civil war began in 2011.

He is now the Europe correspondent for TRT World covering a variety of news stories.
Ranging in subject matter from the Syrian conflict, Brexit, French and German elections, NATO conferences, and the drugs trade between North Africa and Spain.

References

BBC World News
BBC newsreaders and journalists
Living people
Year of birth missing (living people)